Ablaye Yare Faye (born 10 April 1994) is a Senegalese professional footballer who plays as a defensive midfielder for Championnat National 3 club Saint-Apollinaire.

Club career
In 2012, Faye started his career at professional football at Kallithea. He made 22 appearances scoring 3 goals for the club in the Greek Football League.

In 2013 Ablaye Faye signed a three-year contract with AEK Athens which would keep him at the club until 2017.

In January 2022, Faye signed for French club Saint-Apollinaire.

Honours
AEK Athens
 Football League: 2015

References

External links
 
 

1994 births
Living people
Association football midfielders
Senegalese footballers
Kallithea F.C. players
AEK Athens F.C. players
Trikala F.C. players
US Granville players
C.D. Aves players
Athlético Marseille players
Championnat National 2 players
Primeira Liga players
Senegalese expatriate footballers
Senegalese expatriate sportspeople in Greece
Senegalese expatriate sportspeople in France
Senegalese expatriate sportspeople in Portugal
Expatriate footballers in Greece
Expatriate footballers in France
Expatriate footballers in Portugal